Carmila is a rural town and coastal locality in the Isaac Region, Queensland, Australia.

Geography

Being a large locality, there are a number of neighbourhoods within the locality (from north to south):

 Westhill
 Tinerta
 Karloo
 Carmila West
 Flaggy Rock Creek
 Puzzle Pocket

The North Coast railway line enters the locality from the south (Clairview), passes west of the town, and exits the locality to the north (Ilbilbie). The locality is served by a number of stops (from north to south):

 Westhill railway station, now abandoned
 Orkabie railway station
 Tinerta railway station, now abandoned
 Karloo railway station, now abandoned
 Carmila railway station, serving the town
 Flaggy Rock railway station, now abandoned

The Bruce Highway passes through the town as well.  A large portion of the north west of Carmila belongs to the West Hill State Forest.  Along the coast, the West Hill National Park was established in 1971. The major land uses are sugar cane farming and cattle grazing. Professional fishing occurs off the coast.

History
Carmila State School opened on 9 July 1923.

Carmila Post Office opened by March 1924 (a receiving office had been open from 1894).

Carmila West State School opened on 18 August 1924 and closed on 31 December 1965.

West Hill Provisional School opened on 20 May 1925. In 1928, it became West Hill State School. It was mothballed on 31 December 2004 and closed on 24 August 2005. It was at 14 Red Hill Road. The school website was archived.

Carmila Police Station opened in 1933.

The Carmila Library opened in 1978.

At the 2011 census, Carmila and the surrounding area had a population of 398.

Heritage listings 
Carmila has a number of heritage-listed sites, including the Carmila Cane Lift at 49 Hindles Road.

Education 
Carmila State School is a government primary (Prep-6) school for boys and girls at Carmila West Road. In 2014, it had 32 students enrolled with 2 teachers (2 full-time equivalent). The nearest secondary school is in Sarina. In 2018, the school had an enrolment of 16 students with 2 teachers and 5 non-teaching staff (3 full-time equivalent).

There are no secondary schools in Carmila. The nearest secondary school is Sarina State High School in Sarina to the north.

Amenities 
The Isaac Regional Council operates a public library at 16 Music Street.

St Bartholomew's Anglican Church is at 5 Music Street. The Camila Uniting Church meets at the Anglican Church.

St Joseph's Catholic Church is at 12 Music Street.

References

Further reading

External links

Towns in Queensland
Central Queensland
Isaac Region
Coastline of Queensland
Localities in Queensland